İsmayılbəyli (also, Ismailbeyli) is a village and municipality in the Tartar Rayon of Azerbaijan.  It has a population of 1,405.

References 

Populated places in Tartar District